Heidi B. Hammel (born March 14, 1960) is a planetary astronomer who has extensively studied Neptune and Uranus.  She was part of the team  imaging Neptune from Voyager 2 in 1989. She led the team using the Hubble Space Telescope to view Shoemaker-Levy 9's impact with Jupiter in 1994. She has used the  Hubble Space Telescope and the Keck Telescope to study Uranus and Neptune, discovering new information about dark spots, planetary storms and  Uranus' rings. In 2002, she was selected as an interdisciplinary scientist for the  James Webb Space Telescope.

Hammel spends increasing time as a  science communicator. She is the 2002 recipient of the Carl Sagan Medal given to a scientist whose communications have greatly enhanced the general public's understanding of planetary science. She was one of Discover Magazine's 50 most important women in science in 2003. In addition to her public-facing work at NASA, she became the executive vice president of the Association of Universities for Research in Astronomy (AURA) in 2010.

Personal life

Hammel was born in California and is the mother of three children.

Education
Hammel received her undergraduate degree from the Massachusetts Institute of Technology (MIT) in 1982 and her Ph.D. in physics and astronomy from the University of Hawaii in 1988.  After a post-doctoral position at NASA's Jet Propulsion Laboratory, Pasadena, California, Hammel returned to MIT, where she spent nearly nine years as a principal research scientist in the Department of Earth, Atmospheric, and Planetary Sciences.

Career
Hammel is the executive vice president of the Association of Universities for Research in Astronomy (AURA), a consortium of 44 US members (universities as well as educational and non-profit institutions) and 5 international affiliates. 
AURA operates world-class astronomical observatories including the Hubble Space Telescope, the National Optical Astronomy Observatory, the National Solar Observatory, and the Gemini Observatory.
Hammel became the executive vice president of the Association of Universities for Research in Astronomy (AURA) in 2010.
Hammel says she realized about 15 years into her career that  people were needed in the scientific community who plan for and work towards the future of science.

Prior to her appointment at AURA, Hammel was employed as a senior research scientist and co-director of research at the Space Science Institute in Boulder, Colorado. In 2002, she was selected as an interdisciplinary scientist for the Hubble Space Telescope's successor, the James Webb Space Telescope, which launched in 2021. 
She was also a member of the Science Working Group for the giant segmented mirror telescope.  She served on the joint NASA/NSF Exoplanet Taskforce, and on the Science and Technology Definition Team for NASA's Terrestrial planet Finder Coronograph mission.

Research
Hammel's main areas of interest are ground and space-based astronomical observations of outer planets' atmospheres and satellites at visible and near infrared wavelengths utilizing Adaptive optics (AO) technology.

Hammel has described her own research by saying:

The Hubble Space Telescope and the Keck Telescope with its new adaptive optics changed how planetary astronomers look at Uranus and Neptune. With Hubble's advanced cameras and improvements to the adaptive optics systems of the Keck telescope, astronomers became able to capture "unbelievably crisp images" and view many details that could not be seen before.
Hammel's planetary research with Hubble and Keck has demonstrated that both Uranus and Neptune are dynamic worlds.

Voyager 2, Neptune 

Hammel primarily studies the outer planets and their satellites, focusing on observational techniques. She was a member of the Imaging Science Team for the Voyager 2 encounter with the planet Neptune in 1989.

Shoemaker-Levy 9, Jupiter 
In 1994, Hammel led the team that investigated Jupiter's visible wavelength response to the impact of comet Shoemaker-Levy 9 using the Hubble Space Telescope. As the leader of the ground team Hammel analyzed photos of this event taken from the Hubble Space Telescope. Hammel was the National Aeronautics and Space Administration’s public face, explaining the science to television audiences worldwide.

Great Dark Spot, Neptune
Hammel was on the team that first spotted Neptune's Great Dark Spot, a raging storm as big as Earth, and she led the Hubble Space Telescope team that documented the Great Dark Spot's disappearance after just a few years, in 1994.

Weather and rings, Uranus
With colleague Imke de Pater, Heidi Hammel has been studying Uranus with the Keck telescope since 2000. 
Hammel reported clocking the fastest winds ever recorded on Uranus, roaring along between 107 and 111 meters per second (240 and 260 miles per hour); the winds were measured in October 2003 on the northernmost parts of the planet visible at that time.

Hammel discovered that Uranus' nine main rings comprise a single layer of particles, something not found in other rings. With the super-sharp optics system used at the W. M. Keck Observatory, de Pater and Hammel found an 11th ring around Uranus, a narrow sheet of rocky debris. The ring was visible because its edge-on position to the sun and Earth reflected more light than the more typical face-on view. In 2006, they also reported that Uranus had both an extremely rare blue ring, as well as a red ring.

As of 2014, her most recent research involved the imaging of Neptune and Uranus with the use of the Hubble Space Telescope, W. M. Keck Observatory, Mauna Kea Observatory, the NASA Infrared Telescope Facility (IRTF), Mauna Kea and other Earth-based observatories.

Recognition and public outreach
Hammel has been awarded prizes both for her research (including the 1996 Harold C. Urey Prize of the American Astronomical Society Division for Planetary Sciences) and for her public outreach (such as the San Francisco Exploratorium's 1998 Public Understanding of Science Award). 
Hammel was elected a Fellow of the American Association for the Advancement of Science in 2000. She has also been lauded for her work in public outreach, including the 2002 Carl Sagan Medal for outstanding communication by an active planetary scientist to the general public;
the Astronomical Society of the Pacific's 1995 Klumpke-Roberts Award for public understanding and appreciation of astronomy; and the 1996 "Spirit of American Women" National Award for encouraging young women to follow non-traditional career paths.

In acknowledgment of her many achievements, Discover Magazine recognized Hammel in 2002 as one of the 50 most important women in science. 
Her biography “Beyond Jupiter: The Story of Planetary Astronomer Heidi Hammel” has been published by the United States National Academy of Sciences as part of the series “Women’s Adventures in Science.”

Hammel joined The Planetary Society's Board of Directors in 2005. On May 7, 2009 the Women's Board of the Adler Planetarium awarded Hammel with the 2009 Women in Space Science Award.

In June 2010, Hammel participated in the World Science Festival held in New York City, by the James Webb Space Telescope model in Battery Park. Hammel talked about the discoveries anticipated in 2014 with the launching of the James Webb Space Telescope, which will be the world's most powerful space telescope, being the successor to the Hubble Space Telescope. Other speakers included John C. Mather, a Nobel laureate and the Webb telescope's senior project scientist and Dr. John Grunsfeld, astronaut, physicist and "chief repairman" of the Hubble Space Telescope.

On November 2, 2010, The Association of Universities for Research in Astronomy announced the appointment of Hammel to the position of executive vice president. Hammel began her appointment on January 1, 2011.  In accepting this appointment, Hammel said:

The asteroid 3530 Hammel was named in her honor in 1996.

Filmography
 The Planets and Beyond, 2018 TV episode on the Science Channel
 Uranus & Neptune: Rise of the Ice Giants, 2018 TV episode in How the Universe Works, herself as Astronomer
 Hubble's Cosmic Journey, 2015 TV episode on the National Geographic Channel
 Naked Science, 2006–2008 2 TV episodes on the National Geographic Channel
 Hubble's Amazing Universe, 2008 TV episode
 Deadliest Planets, 2006 TV episode, as Dr. Heidi B. Hammel, senior research scientist
 Hubble: Secrets from Space, 1998 TV episode, as Professor Heidi Hammel

Personal quotes

Further reading

See also
List of women in leadership positions on astronomical instrumentation projects

References

External links
 
Hammel in World Science Festival in New York City 2010
Hammel in Live from the Hubble Space Telescope at NASA Quest

Planetary scientists
American women astronomers
1960 births
Living people
Women planetary scientists
20th-century American astronomers
20th-century American women scientists
21st-century American astronomers
21st-century American women scientists
University of Hawaiʻi at Mānoa alumni
Massachusetts Institute of Technology alumni
Scientists from California